On June 18, 2019, federal authorities seized 39,525 pounds or nearly 20 tons of cocaine at the Port of Philadelphia's Packer Marine Terminal. The street value of the drugs is estimated at $1.3 billion. According to the US Attorney's Office it was the largest seizure in the history of the DA's Office of Eastern Pennsylvania. The Mediterranean Shipping Company's container ship, the MSC Gayane (IMO number 9770763), was heading from Chile to Europe with previous stops in Peru, Colombia and the Bahamas. Six members of the crew were arrested. The seizure is the largest cocaine seizure in U.S. Customs and Border Protection's 230-year history, the largest cocaine seizure in US history, and fourth largest worldwide.

The MSC Gayane was met by law enforcement vessels and boarded by about a dozen federal agents while heading into the Delaware Bay. The ship was escorted into the Port of Philadelphia's Packer Marine Terminal. Once docked, the authorities found nearly 20 tons of cocaine. Eight members of the crew have been charged in the arrest. The vessel MSC Gayane was seized by the US Attorney General and the Mediterranean Shipping Company has posted a $50 million bond to gain the release of the vessel.

As of August 31, 2021 all eight crew members charged with crimes have been sentenced.

On October 31, 2022, former professional heavyweight boxer Goran Gogic was charged with one count of conspiracy to violate the Maritime Drug Law Enforcement Act and three counts of violating the Maritime Drug Law Enforcement Act in relation to the MSC Gayane bust.

References

Cocaine in the United States
Cocaine trafficking
Drug raids
Illegal drug trade
2019 in Pennsylvania